is a Japanese professional footballer who plays as a midfielder for JEF United Chiba.

References

External links

1996 births
Living people
Japanese footballers
Association football midfielders
Montedio Yamagata players
J2 League players